The Patent Office of the Republic of Latvia (Latvian: Patentu valde) is an independent state institution operating under the supervision of the Ministry of Justice of the Republic of Latvia. It is the central authority in the field of industrial property protection in Latvia.

External links

Patent offices
Government of Latvia